Squint Lake is a small lake in Burnaby, British Columbia, Canada. It is located southwest of Burnaby Mountain. Squint Lake is surrounded by Burnaby Mountain Golf Course. Squint Lake Park is a park to the north of the lake.

Eagle Creek flows into Squint Lake from the north and continues south eventually flowing into Burnaby Lake. There are two tiny ponds on either side of Squint Lake.  Prehistoric fossils have been found in the surrounding mud. At the south end of the lake, there is an underground chute, approximately 4 feet in diameter, that has still never been traced.

According to a map and materials by Heritage Advisory Committee and Environment and Waste Management Committee of the City of Burnaby (1993), Eagle Creek is fed by a large watershed which drains the slopes of Burnaby Mountain and at one time included a large marsh and beaver pond located in the old Lochdale district. In 1910 when the Vancouver real-estate firm of Ross and Shaw tried to sell their new subdivision on the mountain they printed ads in the Vancouver Daily Province which announced: "Adjoining this desirable property is the beautiful Quinte Lake, where it is proposed to erect a tourist hotel." Apparently local residents thought the name was hilarious and much too grandiose a description for a beaver pond. Instead, Lochdale residents joked that "...you had to squint to see it" and the name Squint Lake stuck. 

Residents enjoyed swimming in the pond and in the winter people came from miles around to skate. Unfortunately later developments drained the swamp and the pond slowly disappeared from the landscape. Its memory is commemorated in Squint Lake Park.
Look for the largest sedimentary rock in Burnaby,a remnant from the ice age.
in 1920, the largest skeletal remains of a duck were found, and are still in storage at the Royal BC Museum.

Access: Phillips Ave at Woodbrook Pl, across from Greystone Shopping Mall.

References

Lakes and waterways of Burnaby
Lakes of the Lower Mainland
New Westminster Land District